State Route 715 is a  state highway in Churchill County, Nevada. It runs north from SR 117 to U.S. Route 50 west of Fallon.

Major intersections

References

715
Transportation in Churchill County, Nevada